Ambi or Ambi may refer to:

 Ambi (film), a 2006 Indian Kannada film
 AMBI, the Israel Stuttering Association
 Ambi Subramaniam (born 1991), Indian-American violinist, pianist and singer
 Ambi, Iran, a village in West Azerbaijan Province, Iran
 Ambi, Mawal, a village in Maharashtra state, India
 Queen Ambi, a character in the video game The Legend of Zelda: Oracle of Ages